Symphonica may refer to:

 Symphonica (Ruins album), 1998
 Symphonica (Joe Lovano album), 2009
 Symphonica (George Michael album), 2014
 Symphonica Tour, an orchestral concert tour by George Michael
 Symphonica (game), a 2012 iOS video game